Ann or Anne Taylor may refer to:

Ann Taylor (writer, born 1757) (1757–1830), English writer
Ann Taylor (poet) (1782–1866), English poet and children's writer, daughter of the above
Ann Taylor (actress) (born 1936), British actress, hostess and singer
Ann Taylor (newscaster) (born  1945), American radio personality
Ann Taylor, Baroness Taylor of Bolton (born 1947), British Labour Party politician
Anne Taylor (netball administrator), New Zealand netball administrator; see Netball and the Olympic Movement
Anne Taylor (netball player), New Zealand netball player
Ann Inc., American clothing retailer that uses the brand "Ann Taylor"

See also
Ann Taylor Allen, American historian
Annie Taylor (disambiguation)

Taylor, Ann